Texas A&M School of Architecture is a school of Texas A&M University at College Station.

With over 2,000 students, the school is one of the largest architectural schools in the nation. Established in 1905, Texas A&M's architecture program is the oldest in Texas. The program became a formal college at Texas A&M in 1969. In 2022, the university changed the designation to school.

Departments

The school's three departments — architecture, construction science, and landscape architecture and urban planning — together offer 15 degree programs, including undergraduate programs, master's degree programs, and three Ph.D. programs.

Architecture
The Department of Architecture at Texas A&M University is one of the largest and most diverse professional programs in the United States, with five unique degree programs. Nationally ranked among other accredited professional programs in architecture, the department enters its second century of architectural education by creating and disseminating knowledge to students through the studio education method with an emphasis on sustainability.
Construction Science
The Department of Construction Science is one of the largest programs of construction higher education in the nation. The department's primary mission is to prepare undergraduates and graduate students for successful careers in construction and construction-related industries. In 2021 it became the first institution in Texas to offer a Ph.D. in Construction Science.
Landscape Architecture and Urban Planning
The Department of Landscape Architecture and Urban Planning, through two undergraduate and four graduate degree programs, provides education, research and outreach in planning, design, development and management of communities to continually improve the quality of the living environment, and by extension, the quality of our lives.

Degrees and Majors

Department of Architecture
 Doctor of Philosophy (Ph.D.) in Architecture
 Master of Science in Architecture (M.S.)
 Master of Architecture (MArch)
 Master of Architecture — Career Change
 Bachelor of Environmental Design (B.E.D.)

Department of Construction Science

 Doctor of Philosophy (Ph.D.) in Construction Science
 Master of Science (M.S.) in Construction Management
 Bachelor of Science in Construction Science (B.S.)

Department of Landscape Architecture and Urban Planning
 Bachelor of Science in Urban & Regional Planning (B.S.)
 Bachelor of Landscape Architecture (B.L.A.)
 Master of Land and Property Development (M.L.P.D)
 Master of Landscape Architecture (M.L.A.)
 Master of Urban Planning (M.U.P)
 Doctor of Philosophy in Urban & Regional Science (Ph.D.)

Minors in the School of Architecture
 Architectural Fabrication & Product Design
 Architectural Heritage Conservation
 Art and Architecture History
 Facility Management
 Leadership in the Design and Construction Professions
 Sustainable Architecture & Planning
 Urban Planning

References

External links
Texas A&M College of Architecture Website
Texas A&M Website
Texas A&M University Map

Architecture
Architecture schools in Texas
College Station, Texas
Educational institutions established in 1969
1969 establishments in Texas